Jin Longguo (born March 2, 1996) is a Chinese singer based in South Korea. He is best known for being a member of the South Korean project boy band JBJ, and for finishing 21st in the survival show Produce 101 Season 2.

Life and career 
Jin Longguo was born in Helong, Jilin, China, on March 2, 1996, to a family of the ethnic Korean minority in China. He is a descendant of the Gim clan of Gimhae.

Jin made his solo debut on June 13, 2018, with "Clover" featuring Yoon Mirae and made a comeback on August 29, 2019, with "Irresistible."

On November 11, 2018, Jin posted a picture of a handwritten letter denying dating rumors with Sonamoo's Nahyun and explaining the controversy of one of his cats: his old cat was put up for adoption but ran away. When found, his ear had been clipped, to show he was considered a stray and was recently sterilized, implying mistreatment from Jin. His appearances on The Show were cancelled. The same day, more controversies arose after Jin's private Instagram was hacked and its contents released, with claims of bullying other JBJ members, misogyny, and disrespect towards fans. Jin wrote an apology letter in response.

Discography

Extended plays

See also 

 Produce 101 (season 2)

References

External links 
 

1996 births
Living people
People from Yanbian
21st-century Chinese male singers
Produce 101 contestants
Chinese K-pop singers
Kakao M artists
Korean-language singers of China
Chinese people of Korean descent
Gimhae Kim clan
Singers from Jilin
Chinese expatriates in South Korea
Choon Entertainment artists